Christopher Ciccone (born November 22, 1960) is an American artist, interior decorator, and designer in New York, Miami, and Los Angeles. He is the younger brother of singer Madonna.

Ciccone began his professional career as a dancer with La Groupe de La Place Royal. He was a dancer for his sister Madonna early in her career. He eventually became the art director for Madonna's Blond Ambition World Tour in 1990 and he was the tour director for her tour, The Girlie Show, in 1993. Ciccone has also directed music videos for Dolly Parton and Tony Bennett among others. In 2008, he released The New York Times Best Seller book, Life with My Sister Madonna. In 2012, he launched a footwear line, Ciccone Collection.

Life and career 
Ciccone was born on November 22, 1960, in Bay City, Michigan, to Catholic parents Madonna Louise Ciccone (née Fortin) and Silvio "Tony" Ciccone. His father's parents were Italian emigrants from Pacentro while his mother was of French-Canadian descent. His siblings are Anthony (1956–2023), Martin (b. 1957), Madonna (b. 1958), Paula (b. 1959) and Melanie (b. 1962). In 1963, Ciccone's mother died from breast cancer at age thirty. Their father remarried in 1966 to the family's housekeeper, Joan Gustafson, and had two more children: Jennifer (b. 1968) and Mario (b. 1969).

After graduating from high school, Ciccone attended Western Michigan University and then transferred to Oakland University where he took dance classes. In 1980, he began his career as a dancer with Le Groupe de La Place Royale in Ottawa. In 1982, he moved to New York to support his sister Madonna's career as her backup dancer. Ciccone appeared in the music video for her single "Lucky Star" in 1984 and performed on her early television performances. Around this time, he worked at the Italian boutique, Fiorucci. Ciccone always had an interest in art and in 1984, he was hired as a receptionist at the Diane Brown Gallery in SoHo, Manhattan. As Madonna's fame grew and she embarked on arena tours, Ciccone was her "dresser". He created the artwork for the 12" version of her single "Like a Prayer" in 1989. Ciccone was the art director for Madonna's Blond Ambition World Tour in 1990. He also was the tour director for her The Girlie Show tour in 1993. Ciccone stated that Madonna demeaned and underpaid him throughout their working relationship.

Ciccone ventured into interior design when Madonna asked him to buy furniture for her new apartment in 1985. He also designed Madonna's Upper West Side apartment in Manhattan, which was featured on the cover of Architectural Digest in 1991. In November 1991, he had his first solo New York art show at the Wessel + O'Connor Fine Art gallery in SoHo. He exhibited seventeen paintings with prices starting at $3,500. In 1994, Ciccone moved to Los Angeles where he indulged in the partying lifestyle and he began using cocaine. Ciccone directed the music video for Dolly Parton's single "Peace Train" and Tony Bennett's rendition of "God Bless the Child" in 1997. That year, he formed a friendship with actress Demi Moore and he was her date to the Gucci evening for AIDS Project LA.

Ciccone is openly gay. He stated that Madonna outed him in her interview with The Advocate in 1991. Their relationship became strained when she married English director Guy Ritchie in 2000. According to Ciccone, he didn't get along with Ritchie, who he claimed is homophobic. "It was...very apparent at the wedding in Scotland, just in the way that his friends made their toast with his gay references. I mean had it been any other word, you know Jew or a black person...anyone would find if [sic] offensive and I have a thick skin", said Ciccone. However, Ciccone's biggest rift with Madonna was over finances. In addition, Madonna appointed a different director and choreographer—Jamie King—for her Drowned World Tour 2001 and didn't tell Ciccone.

Ciccone befriended actress Farrah Fawcett and they bonded over their love of art. They attended Vanity Fair's Oscar party together in 2002.

In 2008, Ciccone released his autobiography, Life with My Sister Madonna, which debuted at No. 2 on The New York Times Best Seller list. The book fractured their relationship and Ciccone asserts that Madonna had him blacklisted from Hollywood. Ciccone also filmed a pilot for an interior design show called Pardon My Decor in 2008. He also made an appearance on the reality show, The Janice Dickinson Modeling Agency, to design a new sleeping quarter.

In September 2012, Ciccone debuted a footwear line, Ciccone Collection, during London Fashion Week. While doing press for his shoe collection, Ciccone revealed that he and Madonna are on "personable" terms. "We're back to being a brother and sister. I don't work for her, and it's better this way", he said.

Bibliography

References

External links 
 
 

1960 births
Artists from Michigan
American gay artists
American interior designers
American fashion designers
LGBT fashion designers
People from Bay City, Michigan
American art directors
American male painters
LGBT people from Michigan
Gay dancers
American music video directors
Living people
Western Michigan University alumni
Oakland University alumni
American people of French-Canadian descent
American people of Italian descent
American male dancers
Madonna